The Diocese of Dodge City is a Latin Church ecclesiastical territory or diocese of the Catholic Church covering twenty-eight counties in Kansas. Pope Pius XII created the diocese on May 19, 1951. The Diocese of Dodge City is a suffragan diocese in the ecclesiastical province of the metropolitan Archdiocese of Kansas City in Kansas.

John B. Brungardt was appointed Bishop of Dodge City in December 2010.

History
The Roman Catholic Diocese of Dodge City encompasses 23,000-square-miles, and 50 parishes in 28 counties. It was established in 1951 from parts of the Diocese of Wichita, the Diocese of Leavenworth, and the Vicariate Apostolic of the Indian Territory established July 19, 1850.

At that time, Sacred Heart Church became the diocesan cathedral. A new cathedral, the Cathedral of Our Lady of Guadalupe was consecrated on December 9, 2001. Our Lady of Guadalupe is the patroness of the diocese.

The Diocese of Dodge City is a suffragan diocese of the Roman Catholic Archdiocese of Kansas City in Kansas.

In February 2019, it was announced that the Kansas Bureau of Investigation (KBI) had been investigating sex abuse allegations against all Catholic dioceses in the state of Kansas, which includes the Diocese of Dodge City, since November 2018. On August 14, 2020, Melissa Underwood, spokeswoman for the KBI, stated in an email “As of Aug. 7, we have had 205 reports of abuse and have opened 120 cases” across all the dioceses in Kansas.

Bishops

Bishops of Dodge City
John Baptist Franz (1951-1959), appointed Bishop of Peoria
Marion Francis Forst (1960-1976), appointed Auxiliary Bishop of Kansas City in Kansas
Eugene John Gerber (1976-1982), appointed Bishop of Wichita
Stanley Girard Schlarman (1983-1998)
Ronald Michael Gilmore (1998-2010)
John Balthasar Brungardt (2011–present)

See also
 Catholic Church hierarchy
 List of the Catholic dioceses of the United States
 Sacred Heart Cathedral, Dodge City, former Cathedral

References

External links
Roman Catholic Diocese of Dodge City Official Site

 
Roman Catholic Ecclesiastical Province of Kansas City
Christian organizations established in 1951
Dodge City, Kansas
Dodge City
Dodge City
1951 establishments in Kansas